Pedersenia is a genus of flowering plants belonging to the family Amaranthaceae.

Its native range is mainland tropical America, from Honduras to Paraguay, and Puerto Rico and the Windward Islands.

The genus name of Pedersenia is in honour of Troels Myndel Pedersen (1916–2000), a Danish-born Argentinian botanist with a large herbarium and also specialist in Amaranthaceae. It was first described and published in Preslia Vol.70 on page 181 in 1998.

Known species
According to Kew:
Pedersenia argentata 
Pedersenia cardenasii 
Pedersenia completa 
Pedersenia costaricensis 
Pedersenia hassleriana 
Pedersenia macrophylla 
Pedersenia volubilis 
Pedersenia weberbaueri

References

Amaranthaceae genera
Plants described in 1998
Flora of Central America
Flora of Puerto Rico
Flora of the Windward Islands
Flora of northern South America
Flora of western South America
Flora of Brazil
Flora of Paraguay
Amaranthaceae